The Ant Commandos, Inc. (TAC) is a designer, manufacturer and distributor of peripherals and accessories for video game consoles based out of Chino, California.  Their flagship products are a line of corded and wireless guitar controllers for the PlayStation 2 music video game, Guitar Hero.

In 2006, RedOctane announced a lawsuit against The Ant Commandos alleging unfair competition, trademark infringement, and copyright infringement regarding their production of the guitar controllers.  The Ant Commandos announced a counter claim on September 21, 2006, filed in the United States District Court for the Central District of California against Activision Publishing, Inc. and RedOctane, Inc. alleging that Activision and RedOctane copied the trade dress and design of their controller.  Both suits were settled in December 2006, in an agreement which allowed TAC to continue selling Guitar Hero peripherals.  In 2007, Activision, parent company of RedOctane, again filed suit against TAC, as well as against several former employees and clients of RedOctane, now working for TAC, alleging copyright infringement and misappropriating trade secrets, among other charges.
The guitar controllers that are sold are the Freedom Vs, the Rocking Vs, The Shredder, and Basses of all kinds. They also sell the Tac Thunderbox 28r Amplifier that can be used to play a real electric guitar, a real microphone, and has audio inputs for any game console.

References

External links
 The Ant Commandos official website

Video game companies of the United States